The Best of Prime Circle is a greatest hits of the South African band, Prime Circle.

Track listing

CD
 Moments (3:28)
 Hello (3:43)
 Live This Life (3:40)
 As Long as  I am Here [Café d'Afrique Mix] (4:21)
 Same Goes for You (4:18)
 Maybe Wrong (4:03)
 Let Me Go (4:14)
 Miracle (3:13)
 My Inspiration (2:51)
 Weaker Still [Exclusive Live Version] (3:56)
 The Way it Could Be (3:31)
 Can't Stop the Rain (3:44)
 Father (3:14)
 Shed My Skin (3:36)
 Nice to Know You (3:23)
 Same Goes for You [Acoustic] (4:12)
 Let Me Go [Acoustic] (4:12)

DVD
 Live This Life
 The Way It Could Be
 Hello
 Take Me Up
 Let Me Go
 My Inspiration
 Weaker Still
 Fall Too Fast
 Run Away
 Same Goes for You
 Maybe Wrong
 Miracle
 As Long as I Am Here
 New Phase
 Shed My Skin

2007 greatest hits albums
Prime Circle albums